The Robert Greenlee House is a historic house located at 806 N. Evans St. in Bloomington, Illinois. Contractor Robert Greenlee built the house circa 1884 for himself and his family. The house has a Queen Anne design topped by a hipped roof with cross gables. A dormer above the attic extends from a second-story front window; the dormer and window are decorated with Eastlake spindlework and bracketing. A tall stained glass window on the north facade features a central rose window and surrounding geometric panes, a pattern fitting both the Queen Anne and Eastlake styles. The cornice and front porch include dragon-shaped bracketing, a decorative element taken from Anglo-Japanese architecture; an Anglo-Japanese influence can also be seen in the roof's pagoda-style curvature.

The house was added to the National Register of Historic Places on February 7, 1997.

References

Buildings and structures in Bloomington–Normal
National Register of Historic Places in McLean County, Illinois
Houses in McLean County, Illinois
Houses on the National Register of Historic Places in Illinois
Houses completed in 1884
Queen Anne architecture in Illinois